Roger Paul Harding (June 11, 1923 – January 8, 2009) was a center in the National Football League.

Biography
Harding was born Roger Paul Harding on June 11, 1923 in Oakland, California.

Career
Harding was drafted in the fifth round of the 1945 NFL Draft by the Cleveland Rams and played with the team for two seasons, including during the franchise's move to Los Angeles, California. He would spend the following two seasons with the Philadelphia Eagles and the Detroit Lions before splitting the 1949 NFL season between the New York Bulldogs and the Green Bay Packers.

He played at the collegiate level at the University of California, Berkeley.

See also
List of Philadelphia Eagles players
List of Detroit Lions players
List of Green Bay Packers players

References

Cleveland Rams players
Los Angeles Rams players
Philadelphia Eagles players
Detroit Lions players
New York Bulldogs players
Green Bay Packers players
American football centers
California Golden Bears football players
Players of American football from Oakland, California
1923 births
2009 deaths